Giulia Di Quilio (born 14 November 1980) is an Italian actress.

Early life and career 
She moved to Rome, not yet adult, to follow acting courses at Enzo Garinei's Ribalte theater laboratory. In 2005 she continued her professional preparation with a scholarship funded by the Lazio region in the specialization of Actors for screen.

In 2011 she discovers the art of burlesque, thus starting a parallel path, which will lead her to become one of the most recognized Italian performers in this performing art, first participating in the television talent broadcast on Sky Uno Lady Burlesque (where she will be among the finalists) alongside Giampaolo Morelli, and later as prima donna of the musical BURLESQUE Dalla foglia alla Voglia, directed by the master of the light show Gino Landi, staged in the spring of 2012 at the Salone Margherita (Rome), as well as performing in major events related to this form of entertainment, and at various festivals in Europe (Stockholm, Geneva, Istanbul, Nice, Berlin) and Australia (Brisbane, Melbourne, Sydney).

In 2014 she played in the theater the role of Linda Ash, the protagonist of the theatrical adaptation of the film Mighty Aphrodite by Woody Allen, obtaining good reviews.

In 2016 she published the book Eros e Burlesque for Gremese publisher, where she tells her experience as a burlesque diva, together with the story of the pioneers of this art (Gypsy Rose Lee, Lili St. Cyr, Bettie Page etc.) signing the work with the stage name, chosen for the burlesque profession, of Vesper Julie.

Later she was chosen as femme fatale in the short film The Red Stain produced by Roman Coppola for the family winery, directed by Rodrigo Savedra and presented at the 2018 Sundance Film Festival. Also in 2018 she is among the protagonists of the comedy Non è vero ma ci credo and also enters as a Guest in Un posto al sole playing the role of Clara Fiorito.

Personal life 
She is married and the mother of twins.

Filmography

Film
13 at a Table, directed by Enrico Oldoini (2004)
The Unknown Woman, directed by Giuseppe Tornatore (2006)
Le ferie di Licu, directed by Vittorio Moroni (2007)
Amore 14, directed by Federico Moccia (2009)
The Great Beauty, directed by Paolo Sorrentino (2013)
Mi rifaccio vivo, directed by Sergio Rubini (2013)
Il ministro, directed by Giorgio Amato (2015)
Non è vero ma ci credo, directed by Stefano Anselmi (2018)
Agony, directed by Michele Civetta (2020)
QN - Il quaderno nero dell'amore, directed by Marilù Manzini (2020)

Television
Sottocasa, TV series (2006)
Io non dimentico, directed by Luciano Odorisio - TV series (2007)
I Cesaroni, directed by Francesco Vicario - TV series (2008)11
Crimini, directed by Claudio Bonivento - TV series (2010)
Lady Burlesque, directed by Jocelyn Hattab - TV series (2011)
Stalk Radio, directed by Dario Cassini - TV series (2011)
Il restauratore, directed by Giorgio Capitani - TV series (2011)
Skin to the Max, directed by Steven Cantor - TV series (2012)
Un posto al sole, TV series (2018)

References

External links

1980 births
Living people
Italian film actresses
Italian stage actresses
Italian television actresses
People from Chieti
21st-century Italian actresses